Mountain View School District is a public school district based in Mountain View, Arkansas, United States. The Mountain View School District provides early childhood, elementary and secondary education for more than 1,700 prekindergarten through grade 12 students at its seven facilities within Stone County, Arkansas.

It serves Mountain View, Fifty-Six, Fox, and Timbo. Mountain View School District is accredited by the Arkansas Department of Education (ADE).

History 
On July 1, 1993 Tri-County School District was disestablished with territory given to multiple districts, including Mountain View. On July 1, 2004, the Stone County School District and the Rural Special School District consolidated into the Mountain View district.

Schools 
 Secondary schools
 Timbo High School, serving grades 7 through 12 in Timbo.
 Rural Special High School, serving grades 7 through 12 in Fox.
 Mountain View High School, serving grades 9 through 12 in Mountain View.
 Mountain View Middle School, serving grades 6 through 8 in Mountain View.

 Elementary schools
 Timbo Elementary School—grades pre-kindergarten through grade 6.
 Rural Special Elementary School—serving kindergarten through grade 6.
 Mountain View Elementary School—grades pre-kindergarten through grade 5.

References

Further reading
These include maps of predecessor districts:
 (Download)

External links 
 
 

School districts in Arkansas
Education in Stone County, Arkansas
Mountain View, Arkansas